Zhang Jinjing (born November 1, 1977), also known as "JJ", is a Chinese gymnast. He competed at  the 1996 Summer Olympics in Atlanta, winning a silver medal in men's team competition, as well as placing fourth in parallel bars and individual all-around. At the World Gymnastics Championships he won gold medals in 1995 and 1997 in men's team competition, shared a bronze for the horizontal bar in 1995, and took the individual gold medal for parallel bars in 1997.

In 2011, JinJing moved to the United States and began coaching at Champions Academy in Morgan Hill, CA, giving instruction not only to local youth, but also to NCAA All-around Champion and Stanford University graduate, Sho Nakamori.

References

External links
 Official Facebook Page: Jinjing Zhang
 Video: Zhang Jinjing - 1996 Olympics AA - Vault

1977 births
Living people
Chinese male artistic gymnasts
Olympic gymnasts of China
Olympic silver medalists for China
Gymnasts at the 1996 Summer Olympics
Olympic medalists in gymnastics
Asian Games medalists in gymnastics
Gymnasts at the 1998 Asian Games
Medalists at the 1996 Summer Olympics
Medalists at the World Artistic Gymnastics Championships
Asian Games gold medalists for China
Asian Games silver medalists for China
Medalists at the 1998 Asian Games
20th-century Chinese people